The Spanish National Road Race Championships are held annually to decide the Spanish cycling champions in the road race discipline, across various categories. The event was first held in 1897 and was won by a Portuguese rider, José Bento Pessoa.

Men

Elite

U23

Women

See also
Spanish National Time Trial Championships
National road cycling championships

References

External links
List of winners by memoire-du-cyclisme.net 

 

National road cycling championships
Cycle races in Spain
Recurring sporting events established in 1897
1897 establishments in Spain
Road Race